is a passenger railway station in the town of Itakura, Gunma, Japan, operated by the private railway operator Tōbu Railway. The station is numbered "TN-07".

Lines

Station layout
 
This station consists of two elevated island platforms serving four tracks, with the station building located underneath. Tracks 1 and 4 are on passing loops.

Platforms

Adjacent stations

History
Itakura Tōyōdai-mae Station opened on 25 March 1997.

From 17 March 2012, station numbering was introduced on all Tōbu lines, with Itakura Tōyōdai-mae Station becoming "TN-07".

Passenger statistics
In fiscal 2019, the station was used by an average of 3819 passengers daily (boarding passengers only).

Surrounding area
 Toyo University Itakura campus

See also
 List of railway stations in Japan

References

External links

  

Railway stations in Gunma Prefecture
Tobu Nikko Line
Stations of Tobu Railway
Railway stations in Japan opened in 1997
Itakura, Gunma